Taras Chervonetskyi (born 10 June 1995 in Ternopil, Ukraine) is a Ukrainian football midfielder who plays for FC Epitsentr Dunaivtsi in the Ukrainian Second League.

Career
Chervonetskyi is a product of the Youth Sportive School Ternopil system. His first trainer was Vasyl Zatorskyi. In 2012, he signed a contract with FC Sevastopol.

References

External links 

 

Ukrainian footballers
Ukrainian footballers banned from domestic competitions
FC Sevastopol players
FC Sevastopol-2 players
Association football defenders
Ukrainian Premier League players
1995 births
Living people
FC Ternopil players
FC Bakhchisaray players
FC Epitsentr Dunaivtsi players
Sportspeople from Ternopil